Blairbuie is a hamlet in Coigach, Scotland. It has just 6 houses and a sheep shed. When driving past the junction which connects Blairbuie to the rest of Coigach, you see some fading writing in white paint on a rockface which reads 'Blairbuie',

References

Hamlets in Scotland